The 1936 South Carolina Gamecocks football team was an American football team that represented the University of South Carolina as a member of the Southern Conference (SoCon) during the 1936 college football season. In their second season under head coach Don McCallister, the Gamecocks compiled an overall record of 5–7 with a mark of 2–5 in conference play, placing 12th in the SoCon.

Schedule

References

South Carolina
South Carolina Gamecocks football seasons
South Carolina Gamecocks football